Haydn Vernon Dackins (10 July 1912 – 2 August 1943) was a Welsh footballer who was killed during World War II.

Career
Dackins played two Second Division games for Swansea Town in 1934–35, before joining Port Vale in July 1935. He played just nine games and scored one goal in the 1935–36 season and was released after the season end. His goal came in a 3–2 win over Bradford Park Avenue at The Old Recreation Ground on 2 November 1935. He then moved on to Northwich Victoria and Macclesfield Town, leaving the "Silkmen" for Hurst after his registration was terminated in November 1938 due to disciplinary action.

World War II
Dackins served in the Royal Inniskilling Fusiliers and was killed in action during the Second World War on 2 August 1943, at the age of 31. He is buried at Catania War Cemetery in Catania, Sicily. This would indicate that he had lost his life during the Allied invasion of Sicily.

Career statistics
Source:

See also
 List of footballers killed during World War II

References

1912 births
1943 deaths
Footballers from Pontypridd
Welsh footballers
Association football forwards
Swansea City A.F.C. players
Port Vale F.C. players
Northwich Victoria F.C. players
Macclesfield Town F.C. players
Ashton United F.C. players
English Football League players
British Army personnel killed in World War II
Military personnel from Cardiff
Royal Inniskilling Fusiliers soldiers